George William Dargan (May 11, 1841 – June 29, 1898) was a U.S. Representative from South Carolina, great-grandson of Lemuel Benton.

Biography
Born at Sleepy Hollow, near Darlington, South Carolina, Dargan attended the schools of his native county and the South Carolina Military Academy.

He served in the Confederate States Army throughout the Civil War.  He studied law, was admitted to the bar in 1872 and practiced in Darlington, South Carolina.

He was elected to the State house of representatives in 1877. He served as solicitor of the fourth judicial circuit of South Carolina in 1880.

Dargan was elected as a Democrat to the 48th United States Congress and to the three succeeding Congresses (March 4, 1883–March 4, 1891). He was not a candidate for renomination in 1890.

He resumed the practice of law and died on June 29, 1898, in Darlington, South Carolina, where he was interred in First Baptist Churchyard.

References

Sources

1841 births
1898 deaths
Confederate States Army personnel
Democratic Party members of the South Carolina House of Representatives
South Carolina state solicitors
Democratic Party members of the United States House of Representatives from South Carolina
19th-century American politicians